Days of the New:  Live Bootleg is a live album by acoustic rock/world music band Days of the New.

Track listing
 Words 5:41
 Freak 6:38
 How Do You Know You? 5:31
 Shelf in the Room 5:22
 I Think 5:35
 Orch of the Medium* 6:48
 The Down Town 4:47
 Solitude 4:52
 Dirty Road 6:01
 Enemy 4:44
 Touch, Peel and Stand 9:03

(* Previously unreleased tracks)

Days of the New albums
2004 live albums